CCSL may refer to:

 Christ Church St. Laurence
 Council of Free Labour Unions
 Corpus Christianorum Series Latina
 Clock Constraints Specification Language, a computer language for modeling relations between clocks